Rubus provincialis is an uncommon North American species of brambles in the rose family. It is found in eastern Canada (Québec, New Brunswick, Nova Scotia) and in the northeastern and east-central United States (Maine, Pennsylvania, Maryland, West Virginia).

The genetics of Rubus is extremely complex, so that it is difficult to decide on which groups should be recognized as species. There are many rare species with limited ranges such as this. Further study is suggested to clarify the taxonomy.

References

provincialis
Plants described in 1941
Flora of Canada
Flora of the Eastern United States